Ts'ao Yung-ho (27 October 1920 – 12 September 2014) was a Taiwanese historian known for his work on the early history of Taiwan. An autodidact and polyglot who failed his university entrance examinations, Ts'ao went on to become the preeminent Taiwanese expert on the Dutch and Spanish colonial eras in Taiwan.

Early life
Ts'ao was born in modern-day Taipei City's Shilin District in 1920, to a family that had produced several generations of educators. In 1939 he graduated from Taihoku Prefecture Second Junior High School, but failed his university entrance exams. Undaunted, he sought out Iwao Seiichi of Taihoku Imperial University, who had spent time in England and the Netherlands learning the languages. Iwao taught Ts'ao Dutch, which was essential for Ts'ao to read the archived material from the Dutch Formosa era. In 1947,  hired Ts'ao as a librarian at the university. The position gave Ts'ao access to a huge range of materials he would otherwise have been unable to see.

Academic career
Ts'ao studied a number of languages in pursuit of his understanding of early Taiwanese history, meaning he could make use of ten languages: Taiwanese, Japanese, English, German, Mandarin Chinese, French, Dutch, Spanish, Portuguese, and Latin. The long-running historical journal, the Taiwan Bank Periodical was masterminded by Ts'ao, while he was also heavily involved in the monumental series of Chinese source material on Taiwan and Fujian history, the Taiwan Documents Collection. Ts'ao retired from National Taiwan University in 1985. Over the course of his life, Ts'ao assembled a 20,000 volume library, classed as one of the finest collections on the Dutch East India Company in the world. Ts'ao was named a research fellow at Academia Sinica in 1998, becoming the institution's oldest research fellow and the fourth to obtain the position without completing a university degree. In 2002 Ts'ao was made an Officer of the Order of Orange-Nassau for his contributions in documenting the history of Dutch Formosa. Ts'ao died of multiple organ failure in Taipei on 12 September 2014, aged 93.

Works

References

1920 births
2014 deaths
20th-century Taiwanese historians
Historians of Taiwan
Officers of the Order of Orange-Nassau
Writers from Taipei
Members of Academia Sinica